Devil's Bridge railway station is a railway station serving Devil's Bridge in Ceredigion in Mid-Wales. It is the eastern terminus of the preserved Vale of Rheidol Railway.

Facilities

The station has two platforms although one has been disused for many years. Following developments during 2012 and 2013, funded by the European Union, there is now a raised platform, improving access on and off carriages. The two platform lines both terminate in buffer stops, and each has a headshunt forward of bi-directional cross-over points for locomotive release.

There used to be a siding, but this has now been re-laid as a demonstration line, running around the perimeter of the site and  physically separate from the main running line.

Under British Rail ownership, the passing loops at Capel Bangor and Aberffrwd were removed and so passenger trains used to cross at Devil's Bridge and it was not uncommon to see three trains at Devil's Bridge at once. These loops have now been re-instated. The current method of working only permits one train at a time to be at Devil's Bridge.

The station is equipped with a water tower, and a station building containing gift shop and  booking office. A separate temporary structure in the car park currently serves as the Two Hoots refreshment room on railway operating days.

Engine shed
There is a small engine shed at Devil's Bridge. The shed is considerably too small to accommodate any of the line's principal locomotives. It typically houses one of the locomotives from the railway's museum fleet, either Wren 3114 or Quarry Hunslet Margaret. The locomotive is steamed on some high season operating days to provide footplate rides along a short demonstration line as an additional station attraction.

References

Heritage railway stations in Ceredigion
Vale of Rheidol Railway stations
Railway stations in Great Britain opened in 1902
Railway stations in Great Britain closed in 1939
Railway stations in Great Britain opened in 1945